Corticifraga nephromatis is a species of lichenicolous fungus in the family Gomphillaceae. Found in Alaska, it was described as a new species by Sergio Pérez-Ortega. The type was found in the Hoonah-Angoon Census Area in the east arm of Glacier Bay, where it was growing on the thallus of the foliose lichen Nephroma bellum. The specific epithet refers to the host lichen.

The fungus can be distinguished from similar species by its ascospores: they lack septa and have an ellipsoid shape with teardrop-shaped or acute ends. Corticifraga nephromatis is one of four species of Corticifraga known to occur in Alaska.

References

Ostropales
Fungi described in 2020
Lichenicolous fungi